Uniswap is a decentralized cryptocurrency exchange that uses a set of smart contracts (liquidity pools) to execute trades on its exchange. It's an open source project and falls into the category of a DeFi product (Decentralized finance) because it uses smart contracts to facilitate trades. The protocol facilitates automated transactions between cryptocurrency tokens on the Ethereum blockchain through the use of smart contracts. , Uniswap was estimated to be the largest decentralized exchange and the fourth-largest cryptocurrency exchange overall by daily trading volume.

History
Uniswap was created on November 2, 2018 by Hayden Adams, a former mechanical engineer at Siemens.

The Uniswap company received investments from business angel Ric Burton and venture capital firms, including Andreessen Horowitz, Paradigm Venture Capital, Union Square Ventures LLC and ParaFi.  Uniswap’s average daily trading volume was US$220 million in October 2020. Traders and investors have utilized Uniswap because of its usage in decentralized finance (DeFi).

Overview
Uniswap is a decentralized finance protocol that is used to exchange cryptocurrencies and tokens; it is provided on blockchain networks that run open-source software. This is in contrast to cryptocurrency exchanges that are run by centralized companies.

Changes to the protocol are voted on by the owners of a native cryptocurrency and governance token called UNI, and then implemented by a team of developers. UNI coins were initially distributed to early users of the protocol. Each Ethereum address that had interacted with Uniswap prior to September 1, 2020 received the ability to claim 400 UNI tokens (worth approximately $1,400 at the time). The market capitalization for the UNI token is over USD 6.6 billion as of February 2022.

Protocol

Uniswap uses liquidity pools to fulfill orders instead of relying on market maker, with an aim to create more efficient markets. Individuals and bots—termed "liquidity providers"—provide liquidity to the exchange by adding a pair of tokens to a smart contract which can be bought and sold by other users according to the constant-product rule . In return, liquidity providers are given a percentage of the trading fees earned for that trading pair. For each trade, a certain amount of tokens is removed from the pool for an amount of the other token, thereby changing the price. No fees are required to list tokens which allow a large amount of Ethereum tokens to be accessible and no registration is required for users. As open-source software, Uniswap's code can also be forked to create new exchanges.

References

Cryptocurrency companies
Digital currency exchanges
Ethereum
Ethereum tokens